Cofina is a Portuguese media conglomerate. The company was established in 1995. It has its headquarters in Porto.

Cofina is the owner of both Correio da Manhã and Record newspapers, and the television channel CMTV as well as several magazines, including TV Guia. The company also controls free newspapers Destak and Metro.

References

External links
Official site

Mass media companies established in 1995
Companies listed on Euronext Lisbon
Magazine publishing companies
Mass media in Porto
Mass media companies of Portugal
Newspaper companies
Portuguese companies established in 1995